Dude Manor is the first EP by Canadian pop punk band Living with Lions.

It was recorded and produced by Stu McKillop of Daggermouth and was released on September 18, 2007 on Black Box Music.  The album was re-released in 10" vinyl format in 2009, after the band signed to American label Adeline Records.

A music video was made for the song "Later is Better" in 2010, directed by Cody Fennell.

Track listing
 "Intro"
 "Later is Better"
 "Colors"
 "Mark Has Bedroom Eyes"
 "Said and Done"
 "A Noisy Noise Annoys the Boys"
 "To All My" (bonus track)

References

2007 albums
Living with Lions (band) albums
Adeline Records EPs